Christmas Jumper Day is an annual fundraising campaign in the UK and Ireland organised by charity Save the Children in the UK. On a specific day in December, people are encouraged to make the world better with a sweater and raise funds for Save the Children by wearing a Christmas jumper and making a suggested donation of £2 (€2), or £1 (€1) for school children. 

In 2022, Save the Children's Christmas Jumper Day is on Thursday 8 December. All donations made to Christmas Jumper Day between 1st December 2022 and 1st March 2023 will be doubled, up to £2 million, thanks to the UK government Aid Match funding.

To take part people can register their workplace, school or group of family and friends on the Save the Children Christmas Jumper Day website.

In recent years, Save the Children has been eager to ensure Christmas Jumper Day is as sustainable as possible. Those taking part can wear a Christmas jumper they already own, shop for a vintage jumper, decorate an existing jumper with festive decorations, or even knit their own.

Christmas Jumper Day is popular with schools and workplaces. Groups may take part in additional fundraising activities on the day, as well as making donations.

Save the Children launched their Christmas Jumper Day in 2012 on Friday, 14 December, and have since raised £30 million to help children around the world.

Celebrities who have supported the event in the past include TV presenter Holly Willoughby, actor Helen Mirren, model Kate Moss, actor Luke Evans and Olympian Mo Farah. 

2021's Christmas Jumper Day was Friday, 10 December.

References 

Save the Children
Annual events in the United Kingdom
Christmas in the United Kingdom